Gerald Browne (1871 or 1872–1951) was a unionist politician in Northern Ireland.

Browne worked as a journalist.  He joined the Ulster Unionist Party and was elected to the Senate of Northern Ireland in 1942, serving until his death in 1951.  From 1947 to 1949, he was a Deputy Speaker of the Senate.

References

1870s births
1951 deaths
Members of the Senate of Northern Ireland 1941–1945
Members of the Senate of Northern Ireland 1945–1949
Members of the Senate of Northern Ireland 1949–1953
Ulster Unionist Party members of the Senate of Northern Ireland